Jan Freidlin (Hebrew: יאן פריידלין; Russian: Ян (Яков) Михайлович Фрейдлин; born 12 August 1944, aged 78) is a Russian composer and pianist. He has composed many pieces for solo instruments (primarily piano), chamber groups and orchestras. He has also written music for films and television, notably "The Summer has Begun".

Education 
Freidlin was born on 12 August 1944 in Chita, Siberia. He moved to Odessa and studied piano performance, composition and music theory at the Odessa Music College.

From 1965, Freidlin studied music theory composition at the Odessa Conservatory under A. Kogan, graduating in 1971.

Career

Odessa 
Freidlin stayed in Odessa for some time after completing his studies. In 1974, Freidlin joined the USSR's Union of Russian Composers, an organisation created in 1932 by Joseph Stalin to contribute to "the moral and ethical education of a modern person".

During his time in Odessa, Freidlin also served as the Artistic Director and Principal conductor of the local Odessa Philharmonic Society Jazz Orchestra.

From 1974 until his emigration to Israel, Freidlin was the head of the Music Theory and Composition section of the Stolyarsky Special Music College, an eminent music college established by Pyotr Stolyarsky in 1933.

Tel-Aviv 
In 1990, Freidlin emigrated to Israel and began teaching at the Rubin Academy of Music and Dance in Tel Aviv. He continued at this post for three years. 

From then until the present, Freidlin has been teaching composition at the Levinsky College of Music.

Awards and honours 
1st place at the 1978 Grand Prix of Warna Cinema Festival (The Summer has Begun).
Tampa Bay International Composers Forum 1st prize for chamber music (Twilight Music).
His piece, Sonata in 3 visions, was written and used especially for the 1998 International Harp Contest.
1st place in the 1993 Society of Authors, Composers and Music Publishers in Israel ACUM Prize (Mise en scenes).
1st prize 1995 International Society for Contemporary Music (ISCM) in composition (Piano Trio No. 2).
2nd prize in the 1995 Guitar Foundation of America composition competition (Letters from Arles).

Compositions 
Jan Freidlin has written for many types of groups and ensembles. He has composed 5 symphonies, a ballet, some concertos and many pieces for solo instruments and chamber groups. Freidlin has also composed soundtracks for 7 motion pictures over 25 theatrical shows and many television shows.

Orchestral works 
Poem of Contrasts - commissioned by the IPO in 2007
Symphony No. 1
Symphony No. 2
Symphony No. 3
Symphony No. 4
Symphony No. 5 - Nostalgias

Solo instruments 
Four Stories - character pieces for piano
Sonata in 3 visions - for solo harp
Letter from Arles - for guitar
Tenderness - for oboe and piano
Momento Mori - for organ
Contemplation - for piano and string orchestra
Concerto for cello, string orchestra and vibraphone (1994)
Moods - solo oboe
Ballade in Black and White - solo piano

Chamber groups 
Twilight Music - for flute, violin and piano
Piano Trio No. 1
Piano Trio No. 2

Theatrical soundtracks 
 Guernica - a ballet
 The Summer has Begun - 1978 film
 U menya vsyo normalno (I am Fine) - 1979 film

References

External links 
Published works with Dohr Edition
Jan Freidlin in IMDB (under name Yan Freydlin)

Russian male composers
1944 births
Russian film score composers